Kari Kosi is one of the two rivers flowing through Purnea (city). It is the abandoned channel of Kosi river which used to flow from center of Purnea which is briefly described in the Bengal District Gazetteers - Purnea by O’malley, L. S. S. It joins Saura river near Harda, Purnea which further joins The Ganga river in Dilarpur, Katihar.

The wetlands created by Kari Kosi makes Makhana farming possible in Purnea and Katihar districts. This area became one of the largest producer of Makhana in India, thanks to this river

Floods 

Along with Mahananda, Kari Kosi usually split Its banks causing deluge and waterlogging in Katihar district of Bihar.

References 

Rivers of Bihar